Earl Wooster High School , or Wooster
High School (WHS), is a public secondary school in Reno, Nevada that is a part of the Washoe County School District. Its mascot is the Colt and the school colors are scarlet, white, and silver. As of the 2010 school year, Wooster was ranked 177th on Newsweek magazine's list of the 1500 best U.S. high schools. It is currently part of the International Baccalaureate program.

History
Earl Wooster High School, named after an early Washoe County School District president and psychologist, is mostly known for its athletic achievements, although its scholastic standards were high as well.  Wooster produced a Presidential Scholar, the highest scholastic award for a high school senior, in 1965 (Doug Samuelson), and a number of other awards. For many years between the 1970s and late 1990s, Wooster dominated varsity football, baseball, and wrestling. In recent years Wooster's notability has shifted from a concentration on its athletics to its academic achievements.  This is likely due to the addition of the International Baccalaureate program in 1996. Since that time, hundreds of students have used this program to further their education in college and beyond. It has been called "a very innovative, healthy environment for students and a truly refreshing climate for tomorrows leaders."

Campus
Located near the Reno-Tahoe International Airport, Wooster is an open courtyard high school that has individual buildings separated by a covered walkway. There is a large metal and auto shop where industrial education classes are held. Wooster has two gyms and three playing fields, the main one named Joe "Mac" Sellers, after its most famous football coach.  The auto shop classes were dropped between the 2003 and 2004 school years.

Extracurricular activities

Athletics
Wooster competes in the Sierra League which belongs to the Northern Nevada 4A Region.
Wooster High's varsity basketball, baseball, and football teams have won the state title many times in the school's history. Joe "Mac" Sellers led the Wooster High varsity football team between 1976–1998, and won 250 of 295 games over 27 seasons as head coach. He won eight state championships which is more than any other football coach in Nevada high school history.
Wooster is also well known for its wrestling program, which has dominated the state and national wrestling tournaments for many years.
Wooster's softball team was one of the best in the nation from 2000-2003.  The Colts won Nevada's 4A (large school) state titles four consecutive years while being ranked as high as 3rd in the nation by ESPN, and 5th in USA Today's poll.
The Colts' baseball team won the 4A (large school) state title in 2002, along with the Northern Region title.
The Wooster Cheerleaders won the state championship in 2007 in Las Vegas, Nevada thanks to the coaching of Angela Dodson and Erin Dastolfo. Cheerleaders are the only team that brought home a state title for the year 2006-2007. Wooster 279 Galena 278.
In 2007, the boys ski team went undefeated for the first time in school history and won the regional title.
Wooster's school song is "The Wooster Fight Song".
In 2007, the Wooster girls swim team went undefeated and won the league championship.
In 2008-2010, the Wooster boys swim team won the Sierra League Championship.
There is also volleyball, soccer, golf, tennis, cross country, lacrosse, and track among many others.

Music

The Band Program at Wooster has sent many of its members to Washoe County Honor Band, Nevada All-State Band, Nevada All-State Jazz Band, The Washoe County Solo and Ensemble Festival, Reno Youth Jazz Orchestra, and the Nevada All-State Solo and Ensemble Festival. There are currently 105 band students. Look for the Wooster Band in the Veterans Day Parade, Holidazzle Parade, and the Vallejo Band Review.
Wooster's Jazz Band participates in many out-of-school activities. The band has participated in the Reno Jazz Festival, the Folsom Jazz Festival, and placed first at the Vallejo Band Review among other events. The jazz band hosts an annual Dinner and Dance night in January. Wooster has two combos that allow students to focus on improvisation and creativity. 
The Music program offers a music appreciation course as well as an IB Music course. Students come from all parts of Washoe County to be a part of this distinguished program. It is the goal of the music program to see its student musicians succeed in college and be rewarded with scholarships.
Wooster has a show (performance) choir.

JROTC

Wooster's Army Junior Reserve Officers' Training Corps was added to the curriculum as an elective in 1967. Their mission is to motivate young people to be better citizens, and have set a goal to give student cadets valuable leadership skills to use after high school.
Wooster retains one of the highest numbers of JROTC participants throughout the Washoe County School District, although Hug High School remains the only school in Northern Nevada with enough cadets to form a regiment instead of a battalion.
As of 2022, the Colts Battalion has received Honor Unit with Distinction for 45 consecutive years.
Wooster's JROTC attends raider and drill meets every year: hosted at variouse WCSD high schools.
The Colts Battalion attends one parade per year: the Veterans Day Parade.  2009 was the last year in which the battalion participated in the Christmas parade at Virginia City.
Cadets are given the option to participate in a seventh period Special Teams class, which performs at drill and raider meets. The program also hosts the Rifle Team, which shoots early in the school year as a winter sport.
Wooster's JROTC is actively involved in community service.  In 2010 the battalion donated 8 tons of food to the Northern Nevada Food Bank during their annual Food Drive.
The Wooster Colts Battalion participates in the Cadet Olympics each year, and won the event in 2018.

Publications
Hoofprints — monthly school newspaper
Pegasus — yearbook
Colts Tale — literary anthology
Colt Connection — update newsletter
The Giddy Up — bi-weekly news program

Notable alumni

Glenn Carano - NFL quarterback (Dallas Cowboys) and USFL (Pittsburgh Maulers), local chef Eldorado Hotel Casino; class of 1973
Patty Sheehan - LPGA golf professional, six women's major titles; class of 1974
Greg LeMond - cyclist and three-time Tour de France winner (turned professional before graduation); class of 1979
Jason-Shane Scott - TV and film actor; class of 1995
David Wise - two-time freestyle skiing Olympic gold medalist
Dave Wyman - NFL linebacker (Seattle Seahawks, Denver Broncos); class of 1982

See also 
 Gillman v. Holmes County School District

References

External links
Official site
First Graduating Class - 1964
Washoe County School District
Washoe County High School information
Website with information about the Wooster Ghost

High schools in Reno, Nevada
Educational institutions established in 1961
Washoe County School District
Public high schools in Nevada